Nordic Students Singers' Summit – NSSS is a choral festival arranged every third year in a Nordic or Baltic country.

History
Since 1987, Nordic and Baltic University choirs have gathered every third year in a choral festival. The first summit took place in 1987 in Linköping, Sweden. It was a renewal of an old tradition from the 19th century when the Scandinavian choirs travelled through Scandinavia by train or boat to visit each other.

The first summit focused on pedagogical and social events. From 1996, when 1,400 singers performed Carmina Burana by Carl Orff in Copenhagen and in 1999 in Tallinn Beethoven's Symphony No. 9, the summits have become more of public events. In Lappeenranta in Finland two pieces were premièred; Symphony No. 111 by Leif Segerstam and Das Lied des Wassers by Marcus Fagerudd. Both under the direction of Leif Segerstam.

Purpose
The purpose of NSSS is "to gather Nordic and Baltic academic choirs in forms of friendship and joy and events of high musical and social quality. NSSS is arranged every third year by local arrangers.”

NSSS 1987–2020
2020 NSSS XI, Trondheim, Norway (cancelled due to world-wide coronavirus outbreak)
2017 NSSS X, Oulu, Finland
2014 NSSS IX, Tartu, Estonia
2011 NSSS VIII, Linköping, Sweden
2008 NSSS VII, Stavanger, Norway
2005 NSSS VI, Lappeenranta, Finland
2002 NSSS   (cancelled)
1999 NSSS V, Tallinn, Estonia
1996 NSSS IV, Copenhagen, Denmark
1993 NSSS III, Trondheim, Norway
1990 NSSS II, Turku, Finland
1987 NSSS I, Linköping, Sweden

References

External links
NSSS — Nordic Student Singers Summit
NSSS 2017 Oulu, Finland

Nordic Students Singers Summit
Music festivals in Europe
Classical music festivals in Sweden
Choral festivals
Music festivals established in 1987
Classical music festivals in Finland
Classical music festivals in Estonia
Classical music festivals in Norway
Classical music festivals in Denmark